Office at Night is a 1940 oil-on-canvas painting by the American realist painter Edward Hopper. It is owned by the Walker Art Center in Minneapolis, Minnesota, which purchased it in 1948.

The painting depicts an office occupied by an attractive young woman in a short-sleeved blue dress who is standing at an open file cabinet, and a slightly older man who is perhaps in early middle age. He is dressed in a three-piece suit and is seated behind a desk. The nature of the office is unclear—it could just as easily be the office of a lawyer, an accountant or of a small business.

Interpretation
Several clues provide context. The high angle from which the viewer looks down on the office implies that the viewer may be looking in from a passing elevated train. Indeed, Hopper later informed Norman A. Geske, the curator of the Walker Art Center which acquired the painting in 1948, that the idea for the painting was "probably first suggested by many rides on the 'L' train in New York City after dark glimpses of office interiors that were so fleeting as to leave fresh and vivid impressions on my mind." So this is not a prestige office—a fact that is reinforced by the awkward lozenge shape of the room and by the small size of the man’s desk. A yet smaller desk, holding a typewriter, may belong to the woman. This implies that she may be his secretary. 

Still, this is a corner office which indicates that within their small organization this is the most prestigious available space and therefore that the man is, perhaps, the manager or boss. 

As in many of his other paintings, Hopper shows movement by means of a wind-blown curtain. In this painting, the ring at the bottom of the drawstring on the blind is swinging outward after the blind has been blown in by a gust of wind—possibly in response to a cross-breeze caused by the passing train. 

The gust explains two other things. First, there is a sheet of paper on the floor beside the desk which must have just blown there from the desk as it has caught the woman’s eye. Second, the wind has blown the dress tightly around her legs, revealing her voluptuous figure to the strangers on the train—but not to the man who stares intently at another document.

There is a sexual interpretation of the relationship between the two individuals. Here, as in a number of Hopper’s works, such as Evening Wind (1921) and Summertime (1943), the stirring of curtains or blinds seems to symbolize emotional or physical stirrings. By contrast, listless curtains in other Hopper paintings like Eleven A.M. (1926) and Hotel by a Railroad (1952) seem to imply emotional stagnation or an inability to connect.

One critic writes, "Although the room is brightly lit, we sense that something strange is going on. Apart from the relationship between the two figures, the suspenseful mood arises from the circumstance that they are apparently poring over confidential material at this late hour, looking for a certain document that has yet to turn up." The man's intense concentration suggests that the matter is critical to him—he has not bothered to take off his jacket despite the fact that it is warm enough for all the windows to be open, and he seems not to have noticed the wind which has caused a document to fall to the floor. 

Another critic observes, "In this painting Hopper offers more clues to a narrative than he ordinarily does. To the left of the desk is a piece of paper the woman has just seen. One assumes that when this voluptuous female reaches for the paper, her action will arouse the man. On the back wall Hopper has painted a section of artificial light, which in turn dramatizes the point where the man and woman will interact with each other." This is certainly one possibility, but another option is to interpret this painting as being one of a series about lost opportunities. Perhaps the woman will bend down and, like the nightgown-clad woman seen bending over in Night Windows (1928), reveal her desirability to voyeuristic strangers on the elevated railroad, still unobserved and unappreciated by her male companion.

Early proposed titles for the painting included Room 1005 and Confidentially Yours, reinforcing the idea that there is a deeper connection between the man and the woman, or that they are working jointly on a matter that involves a high degree of trust between them. In the end, Hopper settled for the more ambiguous title, Office at Night.

As in other nighttime scenes, Hopper had to realistically recreate the complexity of a room lit by multiple, overlapping sources of varying brightness. In this painting as in Nighthawks, his mastery of this problem is a key to his success. In Office at Night, the light comes from three sources: an overhead light, the lamp on the man's desk, which sheds a small puddle of intense light, and from a street-light shining in the open window on the right-hand side. Hopper reported that the overlap of the light from the ceiling fixture and the light from the exterior created particular technical difficulties, since they required him to use different shades of white to convey the idea of degrees of shadow. A careful examination of the corner behind the woman reveals the faint shadow that she casts in the weak light of the ceiling fixture, almost lost by the sharply etched shadow of the filing cabinet in the brighter light of the street lamp.

History

Inspiration and creation
In late December 1939 and early January 1940, Edward Hopper went through a creative dry spell. During this time, according to entries in the diary kept by his wife Josephine ('Jo'), he occupied himself by reading a book by the French poet and essayist, Paul Valéry.

On January 25, at Jo's insistence, Edward and Jo attended an exhibition of Italian masters at the Museum of Modern Art. Jo’s diary records that their attention was drawn, in particular, to Botticelli's The Birth of Venus, which she had seen before their marriage at its home in the Uffizi. Edward had, before this time, only ever seen photographs of the painting. She enthused about the painting, while Edward dismissed it as "only another pretty girl picture"—a dismissive characterization that causes his biographer, Gail Levin, to conclude that this comment betrayed "some deeper stir."

The next evening, Edward declared (as Levin puts it) "that he needed to go out to 'meditate' a new picture". His journey around town seems to have included a trip on the elevated train. A day after this, on January 27, he made another trip, to purchase canvas, indicating that he had conceived his new painting and would soon be ready to begin. Jo's diary for this date notes that "he has a black and white drawing of a man at a desk in an office & a girl to left side of room & an effect of lighting."

Several sketches followed as Hopper adjusted the image on paper to more closely match his vision. As was his practice, Jo served as his model for the female figure. Her February 1 diary entry records, 

Each day, Edward worked on the painting "until it is almost pitch dark." By February 19 the canvas had progressed to the point that Jo observed, "Each day I don't see how E. can add another stroke"—but also that his changes were making "this picture…more palpable—not fussy ... reduced to essentials ... so realized."

On February 22, the finished painting was taken to a gallery, where a variety of titles were suggested. The gallery-owner's assistant suggested: "Cordially Yours; Room 1506." Hopper himself suggested "Time and Half for Over Time, Etc." Further proposed names, derived from these ones, were recorded a few days later by Jo in her and Edward's journal of his paintings.

Notes on the painting from Hopper’s journal
Starting shortly after their marriage in 1924, Edward and Jo kept a journal in which he would, using a pencil, make a sketch-drawing of each of his paintings, along with a precise description of certain technical details. Jo Hopper would then add additional information in which the themes of the painting are, to some degree, illuminated. 

A review of the page on which Office at Night is entered contains the following notes about the painting, in Jo's handwriting:

Ownership and exhibition history
The painting remained in Hopper's ownership for several years. According to Jo's journal notes, it was displayed in 1945 at the Salmagundi Club's 75th anniversary exhibition, to which Edward had been invited as a guest exhibitor. At the exhibition, the painting won a $1,000 prize.

The journal contains a scratched-out note stating that the painting was sold in spring 1948 to the Butler Art Institute in Youngstown, Ohio for "1,500 -1/3", paid on July 27, 1949. Another note, immediately below, contradicts this, stating that the painting was sold to the Walker Art Center in Minneapolis for the same amount, on June 27, 1949.

A final journal note, also in Jo's hand, states "John Clancy cited value for insurance 15,000—1964."

In 2006, the painting was on display for several months at the Whitney Museum of American Art for an exhibition.

See also
Office in a Small City

Notes

External links
Office at Night at the Walker Art Center
Artchive
Office at Night at WordPress

1940 paintings
Paintings by Edward Hopper